Cotopaxia asplundii is a species of flowering plant in the family Apiaceae. It is endemic to Ecuador. Its natural habitat is subtropical or tropical high-altitude grassland. It is threatened by habitat loss.

References

Apioideae
Endemic flora of Ecuador
Vulnerable plants
Vulnerable biota of South America
Plants described in 1952
Taxa named by Lincoln Constance
Taxa named by Mildred Esther Mathias
Taxonomy articles created by Polbot